Glenwood Public Library may refer to:

Glenwood Public Library (Glenwood, Iowa), listed on the National Register of Historic Places in Mills County, Iowa
Glenwood Public Library (Glenwood, Minnesota), listed on the National Register of Historic Places in Pope County, Minnesota